Christine Dzidrums is an American children's author. She won a bronze medal at the 2010 Moonbeam Children's Book Awards for her debut novel, Cutters Don't Cry. She has written gymnast biographies on Clayton Kershaw, Mike Trout, Gabby Douglas, Shawn Johnson, The Fierce Five, Missy Franklin, Kelly Clarkson and Nastia Liukin. Her second young adult novel, Kaylee: The "What If?" Game, won a gold medal at the 2014 Children's Literary Classics Awards. Her biography on Olympic figure skating champion Kim Yuna brought her media attention in South Korea.

Bibliography
 Cutters Don't Cry, 2010
 Joannie Rochette: Canadian Ice Princess (SkateStars Volume 1), 2010
 Yuna Kim: Ice Queen, (SkateStars Volume 2), 2011
 Princess Dessabelle Makes a Friend, 2011
 Timmy and the Baseball Birthday Party, 2012
 Shawn Johnson: Gymnastics Golden Girl (GymnStars Volume 1), 2012
 Timmy Adopts a Girl Dog, 2012
 Fair Youth: Emylee of Forest Springs, 2012
 Nastia Liukin: Ballerina of Gymnastics (GymnStars Volume 2), 2012
 Princess Dessabelle: Tennis Star, 2012
 The Fab Five: Jordyn Wieber, Gabby Douglas, and the U.S. Women's Gymnastics Team (GymnStars Volume 3), 2012
 Gabby Douglas: Golden Smile, Golden Triumph (GymnStars Volume 4), 2012
 Future Presidents Club: Girls Rule!, 2013
 Idina Menzel: Broadway Superstar, 2013
 Sutton Foster: Broadway Sweetheart, 2013
 Clayton Kershaw: Pitching Ace, 2013
 Mike Trout: Baseball Sensation, 2013
 Matt Kemp: True Blue Baseball Star
 66: The Yasiel Puig Story
 Jennie Finch: Softball Superstar (Y Not Girl Volume 1), 2013
 Kelly Clarkson: Behind Her Hazel Eyes (Y Not Girl Volume 2), 2013
 Missy Franklin: Swimming Sensation (Y Not Girl Volume 3), 2013
 Future Presidents Club: Girls Rock, 2014
 Kaylee: The "What If?" Game, 2014
 Mary Lou Retton: America's Sweetheart, 2014

Awards
 2010 Moonbeam Children's Book Awards for Cutters Don't Cry 
 2012 Moonbeam Children's Book Awards for Gabby Douglas: Golden Smile, Golden Triumph 
 2014 Children's Literary Classics Award - Gold Medal for Kaylee: The "What If?" Game

References

External links 
 Official website
 Creative Media Publishing
 Christine Dzidrums on Twitter

1971 births
Living people
21st-century American biographers
American children's writers
American women children's writers
American women biographers
21st-century American novelists
21st-century American women writers